Crushing Digits is the second studio album by the Danish electrorock band VETO. It was released May 2008 in Denmark and in September in rest of Europe.

Track listing 

2008 albums